Nick Holmes is the vocalist of Paradise Lost and Bloodbath.

Nick Holmes may also refer to:
 Nick Holmes (footballer) (born 1954), retired English footballer
 Nick Holmes-Smith (born 1958), Canadian equestrian

See also
 Holmes (disambiguation)
 Nick (disambiguation)